San Miguel de Horcasitas is a town in San Miguel de Horcasitas Municipality, in the Mexican state of Sonora.  San Miguel is located in the center of the state at an elevation of 518 meters.  

The settlement was founded in 1749 as a military fort.  The name is in honor of the Vicerey of New Spain, Don Juan Francisco de Güemez y Horcasitas, first Count of Revillagigedo, who was governing New Spain at the time. After 1777, the governor and captain general of the provinces of Sonora and Sinaloa had his residence here.

In 1814 it became a town (ayuntamiento), one of the first in the state.

The economy is based on cattle raising and subsistence agriculture.

External links
San Miguel de Horcasitas, Sonora (Enciclopedia de los Municipios de México)

Populated places in Sonora